Chola literature, written in Tamil, is the literature created during the period of Chola reign in South India between the 9th and the 13th centuries CE. The age of the imperial Cholas was the most creative epoch of the history of South India and was the Golden Age of Tamil culture.

References 
 Nilakanta Sastri, K.A. (1935). The CōĻas, University of Madras, Madras (Reprinted 1984).
 Nilakanta Sastri, K.A. (1955). A History of South India, OUP, New Delhi (Reprinted 2002).

Tamil-language literature
Literature
Cultural history of Tamil Nadu